The Sweet is a compilation album released as Sweet's debut album in the US and Canada, substituting for the 1971 UK album Funny How Sweet Co-Co Can Be. (The band's second album, Sweet Fanny Adams was also not given a US release, but tracks from that and the band's third album Desolation Boulevard were combined on the US version of that album to compensate for this.)

The album consisted primarily of singles and B-sides released in the UK and Europe in 1972 and 1973. One of the singles, "Little Willy", was Sweet's first and biggest hit single in the US.  The singles "Wig-Wam Bam", "Hell Raiser" and "Block Buster!" were also on the album. Commercially it did not do well, only reaching No. 191 in the Billboard 200.

Track listing
All songs written and composed by Brian Connolly, Steve Priest, Andy Scott and Mick Tucker except where noted.
 "Little Willy" (Mike Chapman, Nicky Chinn) - 3:13
 "New York Connection" - 3:35
 "Wig-Wam Bam" (Chapman, Chinn) - 3:03
 "Done Me Wrong All Right" - 2:58
 "Hell Raiser" (Chapman, Chinn) - 3:15
 "Block Buster!" (Chapman, Chinn) - 3:12
 "Need a Lot of Lovin'" - 3:00
 "Man from Mecca" - 2:45
 "Spotlight" - 2:47
 "You're Not Wrong for Loving Me" - 2:58

Notes
The American CD re-issue of this album includes the live version of the song "Need a Lot of Lovin'", apparently in error.  The studio version was only available as a B-side of the single "Block Buster!" and is available on the 2005 re-issue of Sweet Fanny Adams. The original American vinyl pressing used the studio version of "Need A Lot Of Lovin'".

Personnel
Brian Connolly - lead vocals
Steve Priest - bass, vocals
Andy Scott - guitars, vocals, synthesizers
Mick Tucker - drums, vocals

References

External links

The Sweet albums
Albums produced by Phil Wainman
1973 compilation albums
Bell Records compilation albums